Mestolobes quadrifascia is a moth of the family Crambidae described by Otto Herman Swezey in 1934. It is endemic to the Hawaiian island of Kauai.

External links

Crambinae
Moths described in 1934
Endemic moths of Hawaii